Domingos António de Sousa Coutinho, Marquês do Funchal (19 October 1896 in Lisbon - 27 September 1984 in Lisbon) was a Portuguese horse rider who competed in the 1936 Summer Olympics.

In 1936 he and his horse Merle Blanc won the bronze medal as part of the Portuguese show jumping team, after finishing 16th in the individual jumping competition.

External links
profile

1896 births
1984 deaths
Equestrians at the 1936 Summer Olympics
Olympic bronze medalists for Portugal
Olympic equestrians of Portugal
Portuguese male equestrians
Show jumping riders
Olympic medalists in equestrian
Recipients of the Olympic Order
Medalists at the 1936 Summer Olympics
Sportspeople from Lisbon